Cloverdale, Alabama may refer to the following places in Alabama:
Cloverdale, Lauderdale County, Alabama, an unincorporated community
Cloverdale, Mobile County, Alabama, an unincorporated community
Cloverdale, Shelby County, Alabama, an unincorporated community
Cloverdale, Montgomery, a neighborhood of Montgomery